CAMP, cAMP or camP may stand for:
 CAMP:
Cathelicidin, or Cathelicidin antimicrobial peptide
Campaign Against Marijuana Planting
CAMP, part of the Prague Institute of Planning and Development
Central Atlantic magmatic province
CAMP (company), an Italian manufacturer of climbing equipment
CAMP (studio), a media studio in Mumbai

 cAMP:
 Cyclic adenosine monophosphate (cAMP)
 (+)-cis-2-Aminomethylcyclopropane carboxylic acid, a GABAA-ρ agonist
 camP:
 2,5-diketocamphane 1,2-monooxygenase, an enzyme

See also
Camp (disambiguation)
Camping (disambiguation)